The Street of Forgetting (German:Die Straße des Vergessens) is a 1926 German silent film directed by Heinz Paul and starring Hella Moja, Henry Stuart and Ida Wüst.

The film's sets were designed by the art directors Botho Hoefer and Bernhard Schwidewski.

Cast
 Hella Moja as Viola de Revera  
 Henry Stuart as Juan Alvaro, Kapitän der spanischen Armee  
 Ida Wüst as Marquise de Revera  
 Olga Engl as ihre Gouvernante  
 Paul Otto as José Mendoza, Großindustrieller 
 Ferdinand von Alten as sein Freund, Fernando Cordova  
 Antonio Lopez as Bursche des Kapitäns  
 Fritz Ruß as Diener im Hause Revera 
 Heinz Büthe as Soldat

References

Bibliography
 Jill Nelmes & Jule Selbo. Women Screenwriters: An International Guide. Palgrave Macmillan, 2015.

External links

1926 films
Films of the Weimar Republic
Films directed by Heinz Paul
German silent feature films
German black-and-white films